Köprüköy, is a town and district of Erzurum Province in the Eastern Anatolia region of Turkey. The mayor is Osman Belli (AKP). The population is 1,629 (as of 2010).

References

Populated places in Erzurum Province
Districts of Erzurum Province
Kurdish settlements in Turkey